Neu Kosenow is a municipality in the Vorpommern-Greifswald district, in Mecklenburg-Vorpommern, Germany. It has a total area of 24.89 km sq with a population of 470.

References

Vorpommern-Greifswald